Francis Magee (born 7 June 1959) is an Irish actor. He portrayed Liam Tyler in British soap opera EastEnders from 1993 to 1995. He has also appeared in numerous television shows and feature films, including Sahara (2005), Layer Cake (2004) and The Calling (2000). He played the part of Ordgar, the Housecarl who led the Crowhurst contingent, in 1066 The Battle for Middle Earth (2009), a reconstruction of the year of the three battles from the English perspective.

Career 
Born in Dublin, Ireland, and raised on the Isle of Man, Magee worked as a fisherman before pursuing a career as an actor. Magee worked as a courier for Concord(e) Despatch in Belsize Park and his call sign was 134 whilst training at the Poor School in London's King's Cross. During the 1980s he was the lead singer of Isle of Man-based band Joe Public and Reading-based band Jo Jo Namoza.

He had the role of Victor Rodenmaar in the Nickelodeon TV series House of Anubis. Magee also played Yoren, a member of the Night's Watch, in the first and second seasons of Game of Thrones on HBO. He played electronic musician The Orgazoid in an episode of Peep Show. He also appeared in the 2013 Magners Cider television ad Now is a Good Time.

In 2016, he appeared in "Men Against Fire", an episode of the anthology series Black Mirror.

Filmography

Film roles

TV roles

Video Games

References

External links

1959 births
Living people
20th-century Manx male actors
21st-century Manx male actors
Irish male film actors
Irish male soap opera actors
Irish male television actors
Irish male video game actors
Irish male voice actors
Manx male actors
People from Douglas, Isle of Man